Lovro is a masculine given name. Notable people with the name include:

Lovro Artuković (born 1959), Croatian painter and graphic artist who primarily paints large scale figurative canvases
Lovro Benić (born 1994), Croatian footballer
Lovro Cvek (born 1995), Croatian footballer
Lovro Dobričević (1420–1478), Croatian painter from Kotor
Lovro Iločki or Lawrence of Ilok (1459–1524), Croatian nobleman, very wealthy and powerful in the Kingdom of Hungary-Croatia
Lovro Jotić (born 1994), Croatian handball player
Lovro Karaula (1800–1875), Croatian friar from Bosnia and Herzegovina
Lovro Kuhar, pen name Prežihov Voranc, (1893–1950), Slovene writer and Communist political activist
Lovro Majer (born 1998), Croatian footballer
Lovro von Matačić (1899–1985), Croatian conductor and composer
Lovro Mazalin (born 1997), Croatian professional basketball player
Lovro Medić (born 1990), Croatian professional footballer
Lovro Mihačević (1856–1920), Croatian Catholic priest, author, albanologist and epic poet from Bosnia and Herzegovina
Lovro Mihić (born 1994), handball player
Lovro Monti (1835–1898), Dalmatian politician of Italian descent
Lovro Radonić (born 1925), Croatian water polo player and butterfly swimmer who competed in the Olympic Games
Lovro Šćrbec (born 1990), Croatian international junior football forward
Lovro Šturm (born 1938), Slovenian jurist and politician
Lovro Toman (1827–1870), Slovene Romantic nationalist revolutionary activist during the Revolution of 1848
Lovro Zovko (born 1981), professional Croatian tennis player

See also
Lovro and Lilly Matačić Foundation, founded in 1987 to improve the skill of gifted young conductors, in Croatia and abroad
International Competition of Young Conductors Lovro von Matačić, organized by the Lovro and Lilly Matačić Foundation every 4 years in Zagreb, Croatia
Lovrović
Lovero

Croatian masculine given names
Slovene masculine given names